Ádám Országh (born 6 October 1989) is a Hungarian handball player for Dabas VSE KC and the Hungarian national team.

He participated at the 2018 European Men's Handball Championship.

References

1989 births
Living people
Sportspeople from Szeged
Hungarian male handball players
21st-century Hungarian people